Todd Lamont Spencer (born July 26, 1962) is a former American football running back in the National Football League who played for the Pittsburgh Steelers and San Diego Chargers. He played college football for the USC Trojans.

References

1962 births
Living people
American football running backs
San Diego Chargers players
Pittsburgh Steelers players
USC Trojans football players